Thomas & Friends is a children's television series about the engines and other characters on the railways of the Island of Sodor, and is based on The Railway Series books written by the Reverend W. Awdry.

This article lists and details episodes from the twenty-first series of the show, which started airing on 18 September 2017 in the UK and on 15 December 2017 in the US. The series was narrated by Mark Moraghan, in what was his last series. This was the first series to air on Nick Jr. in the United States.

This series became the first to have engines and vehicles move their bodies as opposed to being static as they had been in the previous series.

Episodes

Voice cast

Lucy Montgomery, Colin McFarlane and Nicola Stapleton officially join the cast from that year's special. Stapleton officially takes over the role of Rosie from Teresa Gallagher in the UK and Jules de Jongh in the US while Rob Rackstraw officially takes over the role of James in the UK from Keith Wickham.

Notes

References

2017 American television seasons
Thomas & Friends seasons
2017 British television seasons